Michael R. Carpenter is an American diplomat serving as United States ambassador to the Organization for Security and Cooperation in Europe in the Biden administration.

Education 
Carpenter earned a Bachelor of Arts degree in international relations from Stanford University and a Master of Arts and PhD in political science from the University of California, Berkeley.

Career 
Carpenter was a career officer with the United States Foreign Service. He served as deputy director of the Office of Russian Affairs, special assistant for the under secretary for political affairs, political-military officer in the Office of European Security, and political affairs and advisor on regional conflicts in the Office of Caucasus Affairs and Regional Conflicts. He served overseas in the U.S. Embassies in Poland, Slovenia, and Barbados. 

Carpenter then worked in the White House as a special advisor for Europe and Eurasia to then-Vice President Biden and as director for Russia at the National Security Council. From 2015 to 2017, he served in the Pentagon as deputy assistant secretary of defense for Russia, Ukraine, Eurasia, and Conventional Arms Control. He has most recently worked as the managing director of the Penn Biden Center for Diplomacy and Global Engagement.

US Ambassador to OSCE
On June 23, 2021, President Joe Biden nominated Carpenter as U.S. Representative to the Organization for Security and Cooperation in Europe (OSCE), with rank of Ambassador. On September 15, 2021, a hearing on his nomination was held before the Senate Foreign Relations Committee. On October 19, 2021, his nomination was reported favorably out of committee. On November 3, 2021, he was confirmed by the Senate by voice vote. On November 29, 2021, he assumed office as ambassador after presenting his credentials to OSCE Secretary General Helga Schmid.

Personal life
Carpenter speaks Polish, Slovene, Czech, French, and German.

References

External links

Living people
Stanford University alumni
UC Berkeley College of Letters and Science alumni
United States Foreign Service personnel
United States Department of State officials
Biden administration personnel
Year of birth missing (living people)
Organization for Security and Co-operation in Europe